Iris Burton (born Iris Burstein, September 4, 1930 – April 5, 2008) was an American dancer and talent agent, who discovered and represented many famous child actors during her career.

Personal life and early career
Burton was born as Iris Burstein in 1930 in Manhattan, New York City, and made a career as a child dancer, later dancing as Iris Burton in the Broadway shows Music in My Heart (1947) and Pardon Our French (1950). She also danced on television, earning $125 per week in 1951 for performing on Milton Berle's program. In the early 1950s, she moved to Hollywood, appearing as a dancer in several films such as Top Banana (1954) and The Ten Commandments (1956).

Tony Award-winning actor Barry Miller (Saturday Night Fever, Fame) is Burton's son from her brief marriage to actor/director Sidney Miller.

Later career
Burton began her agency in 1977, becoming one of the few women at high levels in talent agencies. She was well known for discovering the Phoenix brothers (River Phoenix and Joaquin Phoenix), and their sisters (Rain, Liberty and Summer) whom she spotted singing for spare change in Westwood, Los Angeles. She worked with River throughout his short career.

Burton and her relationship with Greg Sestero is described in a chapter of Sestero's 2013 memoir The Disaster Artist. Sestero portrays Burton as a warm, quick-witted agent who took on representing him despite his lack of experience and ultimately led him to his first big roles. This chapter was dramatized briefly in the 2017 film adaptation of the book, with Burton portrayed by Sharon Stone.

Death
Iris Burton died on April 5, 2008, aged 77, from pneumonia and complications of Alzheimer's disease in Woodland Hills, California at the Motion Picture and Television Country House.

References

External links

1930 births
2008 deaths
Actresses from New York City
American child actresses
American female dancers
Dancers from New York (state)
American film actresses
Jewish American actresses
Deaths from pneumonia in California
People from Woodland Hills, Los Angeles
People from Manhattan
Hollywood talent agents
American talent agents
20th-century American dancers
20th-century American actresses
Deaths from Alzheimer's disease
Deaths from dementia in California
20th-century American Jews
21st-century American Jews
21st-century American women